is a Japanese musician and songwriter. He is known as lead guitarist of the rock band Buck-Tick since 1983. He has also performed in musical side-projects such as Schaft (1991–1994, 2015), Schwein (2001), and more recently Lucy (2004).

Career
In 1984, when Imai and his friend and then Buck-Tick singer Araki graduated high school, they moved to Tokyo together, where Imai entered design school. He has been the guitarist and main composer of Buck-Tick since 1983. Despite being right-handed, Imai plays guitar left-handed.

In 1989, he was arrested for LSD possession.

In 2008, he announced on his blog that he got married. He announced the birth of his first child in August 2013.

He has also appeared on/composed for Mika Kaneko's Kick, Naoko Nozawa's Tonkichi Chinpei Kanta, Der Zibet's Shishunki II, Soft Ballet's Million Mirrors, The Stalin's Shinda Mono Hodo Aishite Yaru Sa, PIG's Sinsation and Wrecked, Yukinojo Mori's Tenshi no Ita Wakusei and Poetic Evolution ~With Eleven Guitarists~, Guniw Tools's Dazzle, Acid Android's Code, the compilation Tribute to The Star Club featuring Hikage, and Tomoyasu Hotei's All Time Super Guest. Together with Yukinojo Mori, Imai covered the song "Eyes Love You" for the 2013 hide tribute album Tribute VII -Rock Spirits-.

Lucy is another side-project where he is guitarist and vocalist. Formed in 2004 it includes guitarist and vocalist Kiyoshi (ex. Spread Beaver, Machine) and drummer Katsushige Okazaki (Age of Punk). Both Imai and Kiyoshi play guitars and sing, and write music and lyrics for the group. Lucy has released 2 albums; Rockarollica and Rockarollica II, 3 DVDs; Lucy Show - Shout, Speed, Shake Your Rockarollica, Lucy Show 002 Live at Unit and Lucy Show 002 Live at Studio Coast, and 1 single; "Bullets -Shooting Super Star-". However, they have been inactive since 2008.

Discography
With Buck-Tick

With Lucy
Rockarollica (June 9, 2004) Oricon peak position: #16
Lucy Show - Shout, Speed, Shake Your Rockarollica (November 17, 2004) #35
"Bullets -Shooting Super Star-" (March 29, 2006) #28
Rockarollica II (April 26, 2006) #42
Lucy Show 002 Live at Unit (November 1, 2006) #52
Lucy Show 002 Live at Studio Coast (November 1, 2006) #46

References

External links
 Official blog
 Lucy Official website

1965 births
Living people
Buck-Tick members
Visual kei musicians
Japanese rock guitarists
Japanese male rock singers
People from Gunma Prefecture
Musicians from Gunma Prefecture
Schwein members
Japanese songwriters
20th-century Japanese guitarists
21st-century Japanese guitarists